Stacey Morrison (née Daniels, born 1974) is a New Zealand television and radio host. Morrison speaks fluent Te Reo Māori and is active in promoting Māori language, culture and health.

Biography 
Morrison grew up in Christchurch, New Zealand and attended Aranui High School.

In 1990, when Morrison was 18 years old, she landed her first role on the popular New Zealand children's show What Now. However she is better known as a host on the TV show Mai Time during the late 1990s. In 2002, Morrison was nominated for her work on Mai Time in the Best Presenter category at the 2002 TV Guide New Zealand Television Awards. She has also hosted radio shows on Mai FM, Flava and Classic Hits FM. In 2009, Morrison signed on to co-host a new version of the hit show It's in the Bag, with Pio Terei on Māori Television.

Morrison is an advocate and educator of Māori language and has co-written several Māori language books for learners. Morrison learnt Māori language as an adult.

In February 2020, Morrison was appointed cultural advisor for the Australian soap opera Home and Away after a Māori family joined the cast of the show.

Books

 Morrison, S., & Morrison, S. (2020). MAORI MADE FUN: 200+ puzzles and games to boost your reo. Raupō Publishing (New Zealand)
 Morrison, S. (2019). Māori at work: The everyday guide to using te reo Māori in the workplace. Auckland, NZ: Penguin Random House New Zealand
 Morrison, S., & Morrison, S. (2018). Māori made easy 2: The next step in your language-learning journey. Raupō Publishing (New Zealand)
 Morrison, S., & Morrison, S. (2017). Māori at home: An everyday guide to learning the Māori language. Raupō Publishing (New Zealand)

Personal life
Morrison is the daughter of radio host James Daniels. She married Te Karere presenter Scotty Morrison in Rotorua on 7 January 2006. They have three children together.

See also
 List of New Zealand television personalities

References

External links
Stacey Morrison's profile on NZ On Screen

New Zealand television presenters
New Zealand women television presenters
New Zealand radio presenters
New Zealand women radio presenters
1970s births
Living people
People educated at Aranui High School
People from Christchurch
Ngāi Tahu people
Te Arawa people